The Longreach Leader is a newspaper published in Longreach, Queensland, Australia.

History
The first issue was published on 5 January 1923. 

In early October 2021 the owners of the paper advised that production of the weekly paper would be suspended, after 98 years, due to financial losses primarily caused by shrinking advertising revenue.  The last edition prior to the suspension will be published on Friday 15th October 2021.  The publisher hopes to restructure the company and the newspaper and bring it back in a sustainable manner.

Digitisation
The papers have been digitised as part of the Australian Newspapers Digitisation Program  of the National Library of Australia.

References

External links
 
 

Longreach Leader
Longreach, Queensland
1923 establishments in Australia
Newspapers established in 1923
Newspapers on Trove